The General Electric GE38 is a gas turbine developed by GE Aviation for turboprop and turboshaft applications. It powers the Sikorsky CH-53K King Stallion as the T408.

Design and development

The GE27 was developed in the early 1980s under the "Modern Technology Demonstrator Engines" (MTDE) program sponsored by the United States Army Aviation Applied Technology Directorate. Sporting a 22:1 pressure ratio, which was a record for single-spool compressors at the time, the GE27 was GE's unsuccessful submission to power the Bell Boeing V-22 Osprey tiltrotor aircraft. The GE27 first ran in late 1984, but it unexpectedly lost the V-22 engine competition to the Allison 501-M80C, which was not a participant in the MTDE program.

In the late 1980s, GE used the GE27 as the basis for the commercial development of turboshafts, turboprops, turbofans, and propfans under the GE38 name. GE formed a 50/50 venture with Garrett (then a division of AlliedSignal) to develop the turbofan variant called the CFE (Commercial Fan Engines) CFE738, which used the GE27's gas generator core. One of a range of advertised GE38 unducted fan (UDF) sizes, the  takeoff thrust GE38-B5 was for a time the baseline engine for the West German-Chinese MPC-75 regional airliner. The GE38 became the T407 military turboprop in partnership with Lycoming Engines for the Lockheed P-7A, with a maximum takeoff power of 6,000 shp (4,475 kW). First run on December 26, 1989, the T407 engine was scheduled to undergo flight testing on a Lockheed P-3 Orion testbed aircraft in the summer of 1990, but the US Navy canceled Lockheed's P-7 contract on July 20, 1990. The commercial version of the T407 was the GLC38 (General Electric/Lycoming Commercial 38), which was unsuccessfully offered for several turboprop airliners in the late 1980s and early 1990s.

The new T408 (GE38-1B) is slated to power the new Sikorsky CH-53K King Stallion three-engined helicopter for the US Marine Corps.  It has a power rating of 7,500 shp.  The GE38 completed its first round of ground testing in May 2010. Two test engines have completed over 1,000 hours of ground testing by November 2011. Five test engines will be used in the 5,000-hour test program. In September 2019, GE delivered the first production T408 engine to the U.S. Naval Air Systems Command (NAVAIR) for the CH-53K. GE also offered the engine to power the U.S. Navy's Ship-to-Shore Connector air-cushioned landing craft.

The T408 was also tested by the U.S. Army and Boeing as an alternative powerplant on an NCH-47D Chinook testbed helicopter. The helicopter configuration was ground tested beginning in late 2019, followed by an initial flight on September 22, 2020. Conclusion of the test trials was announced on May 12, 2021.

Variants
T407-GE-400
 Lockheed P-7 
T408-GE-400 (GE38-1B)
 Boeing NCH-47D Chinook (flying testbed)
 Sikorsky CH-53K King Stallion
CFE CFE738 Turbofan variant of the T407-GE-400, used on the Dassault Falcon
CPX38 Proposed turboprop engine variant of the GE38-1B
GE38-3 An  class derivative engine under consideration by the U.S. military in 2006
GLC38 Proposed turboprop variant of the T407-GE-400

Applications
 Boeing NCH-47D Chinook (flying testbed)
 Sikorsky CH-53K King Stallion

Specifications (T408)

See also

References

Bibliography

External links
 General Electric GE38 page
 
 GE38 page on deagel.com

GE38
1980s turboshaft engines